Star Lake may refer to:

 Star Lake (Cook County, Minnesota)
 Star Lake (Otter Tail County, Minnesota), a lake in central Minnesota
 Star Lake Township, Minnesota, a township named for the lake
 Star Lake (St. Lawrence, New York)
 Star Lake, New York, a hamlet on the lake
 Star Lake (Zhaoqing), a lake in Guangdong Province, China
 Star Lake (Newfoundland), a reservoir in Newfoundland, Canada
 Gwiazda Lake (Star lake in Polish), a ribbon lake in the Pomeranian Voivodeship, Poland
 Star Lake Amphitheater, now known as the First Niagara Pavilion, outside Pittsburgh, Pennsylvania
 Star Lake, Washington, a natural lake in Auburn, Washington.
 Star Lake, Wisconsin, an unincorporated community
 Star Lake (Vilas County, Wisconsin), a lake in Vilas County